The Asian records are the fastest times ever swum by a swimmer representing a member federation of the Asia Swimming Federation (AASF), Asia's governing body of swimming.

Long course (50 m)

Men

Women

Mixed relay

Short course (25 m)

Men

Women

Mixed relay

References

External links
AASF official web site
AASF Asian Swimming Records page 18 December 2022 updated

Asian
Records
Swimming records
Swimming